Robert Smallbones  (19 March 1884 – 29 May 1976) was a British diplomat and humanitarian who arranged the issue of visas to persecuted Jewish people in Germany before the Second World War and visited concentration camps to demand the release of prisoners. He was posthumously awarded the medal of a British Hero of the Holocaust in 2013.

Early life
Robert Townsend Smallbones was the second son of Paul Smallbones of Schloss Velm, Austria.

He was educated at Trinity College, Oxford and gained a Master of Arts degree.

Consular Service
Smallbones joined the British Foreign Office (Consular Service) on 13 October 1910, and served as Vice-Consul in Portuguese West Africa (present-day Angola), where he was active in work to bring an end to slavery. On 24 December 1914 he was appointed Consul at Stavanger in Norway. Smallbones was appointed a Member of the Order of the British Empire in the New Years Honours List of 1918. On 11 January 1920 he was appointed British Consul for the State of Bavaria resident in Munich, Germany, then on 16 July 1922 Consul for Slovakia and Ruthenia resident at Bratislava, during which time he was British Delegate to the Donau Commission.

Known at the Foreign Office in London as "Bones" he very quickly ruffled relations with his outspoken criticism of the Slovakian government policy against minority groups and in 1923 and 1924 he made extensive tours of Slovakia and Carpathian-Ukraine to report to London on the situation.

Smallbones was appointed Consul for the Republic of Liberia resident in Monrovia on 5 January 1926, then for Portuguese West Africa resident in Luanda, Angola from 11 August 1927, and for the Banovinas of Dravska, Savaka and Primorska resident in Zagreb from 21 June 1931.

Service in Nazi Germany
He was promoted after the successful posting to Zagreb and appointed Consul-General at Frankfurt am Main in Germany in 1932 just before the Nazi Party gained power. Smallbones held his position through the difficult pre-war years and in September 1939, at the outbreak of World War II, he was evacuated with all British diplomatic staff. After Kristallnacht he worked to assist persecuted Jewish people, gaining them travel visas, which would enable them to leave Nazi Germany by exploiting any opportunities the system allowed and some which it did not. He was remembered in the Jewish Chronicle as "the diplomat who faced down the Gestapo", for visiting concentration camps to demand the release of Jewish people. He allowed his daughter Irene to horse-whip Gestapo agents arresting Jews and provided refuge for hundreds of Jewish people in his official residence. Frustrated at the refusal of the United States to issue visas to the Jews, he masterminded and oversaw what became known as the "Smallbones Scheme" to extend the British efforts to evacuate the Jews from Germany; and in October 1939 the British Government calculated that he had saved 48,000 people and had been in the process of issuing papers to 50,000 more when war broke out.

In a letter dated 1938, Smallbones claimed that "The explanation for this outbreak of sadistic cruelty may be that sexual perversion, in particular homo-sexuality, are very prevalent in Germany."

His activities assisting Jewish people were carefully documented by the Gestapo and he is named in The Black Book (the Sonderfahndungsliste G.B. or "Special Search List Great Britain"), a list of prominent British residents to be arrested upon the successful invasion of Britain by Nazi Germany in 1940. The Black Book was a product of the SS Einsatzgruppen, compiled by SS-Oberführer Walter Schellenberg, and contained the names of 2,820 people—British subjects and European exiles—living in Britain, who were to be immediately arrested upon the success of Unternehmen Seelöwe (Operation Sea Lion), the invasion, occupation, and annexation of Great Britain to the Third Reich. The book states which German authority each arrested person was to be handed to and Smallbones was required by Department IVE4 of the Gestapo.

Smallbones was posthumously awarded the medal of a British Hero of the Holocaust.

Wartime years
The Smallbones family sailed from London aboard the passenger liner  on 20 December 1939 bound for Brazil. From 11 January 1940 until he retired in 1945 he was Consul-General at Sao Paulo in Brazil.

Smallbones was appointed a Companion of the Order of St. Michael and St. George on 2 June 1943 for his service as Consul-General at Sao Paulo.

After his retirement in 1945 Smallbones and his wife settled in Brazil and occasionally visited England aboard .

Family life
He married Inga Gjertson (1890–1988) of Kinn, Norway and they had a son (Robert Peter) and a daughter (Irene, born 1919 in Stavanger, Norway). 
Their son Lieutenant Robert Peter Smallbones, General List, died on 17 May 1941 in Egypt serving with the Eighth Army; he is buried at the Cairo War Cemetery.

Smallbones died on 29 May 1976 in São Paulo, Brazil.

Honours and awards
Companion of the Order of St. Michael and St. George in June 1943 as Consul-General in Sao Paulo.
Member of the Order of the British Empire in January 1918 as Vice-Consul in Stavanger, Norway.
British Hero of the Holocaust medal, posthumously in 2013.

Commemoration
A plaque to Smallbones and his vice-consul Arthur Dowden was unveiled in 2013 by John Bercow, the Speaker of the House of Commons, on the green fronting of one of London's largest Jewish cemeteries in Golders Green.

A similar plaque was unveiled in Frankfurt.

A plaque at the British Foreign and Commonwealth Office, London, unveiled on 20 November 2008 naming him and seven other British diplomats who had worked to assist Jewish refugees.

References

Bibliography
 
 
 
 
 

1884 births
1976 deaths
Alumni of Trinity College, Oxford
British diplomats
British expatriates in Norway
British expatriates in Germany
British expatriates in Czechoslovakia
British expatriates in Liberia
British expatriates in Yugoslavia
British emigrants to Brazil
Companions of the Order of St Michael and St George
Members of the Order of the British Empire